Adrien Hardy (born 30 July 1978) is a French rower and Olympic gold medallist.

At Olympic level, in 2004, Hardy won the gold medal in the men's double sculls event, rowing with Sébastien Vieilledent.  He also competed at the 2000 Olympics (with Frédéric Kowal), 2008 Olympics (with Jean-Baptiste Macquet) and, in the quadruple sculls event, at the 2012 Olympics (with Benjamin Chabanet, Matthieu Androdias and Pierre-Jean Peltier).

At world level he has won two gold medals in the double sculls, in 2003 (with Sébastien Vieilledent) and in 2006 (with Jean-Baptiste Macquet), and two silver medals, in 2001 (with Sébastien Vieilledent) and 2007 (with Jean-Baptiste Macquet).

At European level he has two medals, one gold and one bronze, in the men's eight event.

References

External links 
 
 
 
 

1978 births
Living people
French male rowers
Olympic medalists in rowing
Medalists at the 2004 Summer Olympics
Rowers at the 2000 Summer Olympics
Rowers at the 2004 Summer Olympics
Rowers at the 2008 Summer Olympics
Rowers at the 2012 Summer Olympics
World Rowing Championships medalists for France
Sportspeople from Nîmes
Olympic gold medalists for France
European Rowing Championships medalists
21st-century French people